The I-35W Minnesota River Bridge connects the counties of Hennepin and Dakota, and the cities of Bloomington and Burnsville, over the Minnesota River. The bridge has eight lanes, four lanes in each direction. Inner lanes are MnPass HOV lanes, and a walking/bicycling path is located on the east side of the northbound span.

This bridge replaced a seven-lane steel girder bridge, constructed in 1960 by the Minnesota Highway Department. When it was built, it replaced a former bridge, located just to the east of the current bridge site, that carried US 65. Approaches to the former bridge had issues with flooding, with a 1965 flood putting the causeway just south of the bridge completely underwater. MnPass lanes were added in 2009.

See also
 
 
 
 List of crossings of the Minnesota River

References

Road bridges in Minnesota
Bridges completed in 1960
Bridges on the Interstate Highway System
Interstate 35
Bridges over the Minnesota River
Steel bridges in the United States
Plate girder bridges in the United States
Buildings and structures in Dakota County, Minnesota
Buildings and structures in Bloomington, Minnesota
Bridges in Hennepin County, Minnesota